B66  may refer to:
 B66 (New York City bus) in Brooklyn
 Douglas B-66 Destroyer
 Sicilian, Richter-Rauzer, Encyclopaedia of Chess Openings code